Ákos Ráthonyi (26 March 1908 – 6 January 1969) was a Hungarian film director and screenwriter. He directed 42 films between 1936 and 1968. He was born in Budapest, Hungary and died in Munich, West Germany.

Selected filmography
 Sarajevo (1940)
 Renee XIV (1946, uncompleted)
 Unknown Sender (1950)
 You Have to be Beautiful (1951)
 Don't Blame the Stork (1954)
 Mrs. Warren's Profession (1960)
 The Devil's Daffodil (1961)
 Beloved Impostor (1961)
 The Phony American (1961)
 Cave of the Living Dead (1964)
 Take Off Your Clothes, Doll (1968)

References

External links

1908 births
1969 deaths
Hungarian film directors
Male screenwriters
Hungarian male writers
German-language film directors
20th-century Hungarian screenwriters